Rudhra Thaandavam is a 1978 Indian Tamil-language devotional comedy film directed by K. Vijayan and written by A. Veerappan. The film stars Vijayakumar, V. K. Ramasamy, Nagesh and Sumithra. It revolves around Shiva taking a priest around the world to provide him with knowledge. The film was released on 3 February 1978, and became a success.

Plot 

Ponnambalam, a poor priest, has a dream where Shiva takes him around the world to provide him with knowledge.

Cast 
Vijayakumar as Ravi
V. K. Ramasamy as Shiva
Nagesh as Ponnambalam
Thengai Srinivasan as Kanagasabai
M. R. R. Vasu as Marappan
Suruli Rajan as Varadha
Radha Ravi as Gopal
Sumithra as Ponnambalam's daughter
Manorama

Production 
Filming took place at Vauhini Studios in Madras (now Chennai). Ramasamy earlier played Shiva in a play also titled Rudhra Thaandavam, staged in 1976.

References

External links 
 

1970s Tamil-language films
1978 comedy films
1978 films
Films directed by K. Vijayan
Films scored by M. S. Viswanathan
Films shot in Chennai
Hindu devotional films
Indian comedy films